Wilfred Joseph "Dukes" Duford (June 11, 1898 – May 8, 1981) was an American college football player, coach, and university athletic director. He was the head football coach at Saint Louis University, Saint Ambrose University, and the University of Saint Mary (Kansas).

Biography
Duford was born on June 11, 1898 in Menomonie, Wisconsin. Duford attended Niagara High School and Marquette University, where he played football, baseball, and basketball. Duford lettered in basketball from 1921 to 1923. He graduated in 1924.

After college, he played professional football in the National Football League (NFL) for one season with the Green Bay Packers. He saw action in three games in 1924 as a halfback.

Duford began his college football coaching career with a two-year stint at the University of Saint Mary in Kansas. He then moved on to Saint Ambrose University in Iowa, where he coached from 1931 to 1939. During his tenure there, Saint Ambrose posted a 60–10–7 record.

Impressed by his winning record, St. Ambrose University signed Duford to a multi-year contract as its football coach. Duford served as both the head football coach and athletic director at Saint Louis from 1940 to 1947. He also served as the basketball coach for the 1944–45 season and posted an 11–6 record. Duford and his staff resigned from Saint Louis after the 1947 season in which the football team amassed a 4–6 record. In his autobiography, Memories of a Hall of Fame Sportswriter, Bob Broeg called Duford his "candidate for the most noble coach of all."

In 1966, Duford was working as the Commissioner of the St. Louis Council on Human Relations, which was set up to facilitate racial integration of the city. Duford returned to Saint Louis University as its interim athletic director in 1967. Duford was inducted into the Saint Louis University's Billiken Hall of Fame in 1995.

Duford died at his Missouri home in 1981 of a heart ailment.

Head coaching record

Football

Basketball

 The MVC also cancelled the season due to World War II.

References

External links
 
 

1898 births
1981 deaths
American football halfbacks
American men's basketball players
Green Bay Packers players
Marquette Golden Avalanche football players
Saint Louis Billikens athletic directors
Saint Louis Billikens football coaches
Saint Louis Billikens men's basketball coaches
Saint Mary Spires football coaches
St. Ambrose Fighting Bees football coaches
St. Ambrose Fighting Bees men's basketball coaches
People from Menomonie, Wisconsin
Coaches of American football from Wisconsin
Players of American football from Wisconsin
Baseball players from Wisconsin
Basketball coaches from Wisconsin
Basketball players from Wisconsin